Passion According to Matthew (Muke po Mati) is a 1975 Yugoslavian film directed by Lordan Zafranović. At the 1975 Pula Film Festival it received awards for directing, cinematography and creativity.

The film stars Boris Cavazza as Matthew. It was written by Mirko Kovač and Lordan Zafranović and was produced by Jadran Film and Croatia Film.

Cast 
The cast of Passion According to Matthew includes Boris Cavazza as Matthew, Alicja Jachiewicz as Ora, Žarko Radić as Luke, Božidarka Frajt as Mother, Mirko Boman and Hermina Pipinić.

Awards 
 Pula Film Festival, 1975:
 Lordan Zafranović – the "Milton Manaki" film critics' award
 Karpo Aćimović-Godina - the "Foto" award for cinematography
 Lordan Zafranović - the "Mladost" award for creative contributions

References

External links 
 

1975 films
Croatian romantic drama films
1970s Croatian-language films
Yugoslav romantic drama films
Jadran Film films
1975 romantic drama films